Kanth is an Indian surname. Notable people with the surname include:

Amod Kanth, Indian social activist and former policeman
Kanth Kaler (born 1994), Punjabi singer
Melvinder Kanth, Singaporean film-maker and actor 
Rajani Kannepalli Kanth, American economist and philosopher